Đorđe Jovanov Vojnović (1833–1895) was a Serbian politician.

Biography
Vojnović was born in the noble House of Vojnović from Herceg Novi, as the son of Jovan Đorđev Vojnović and Katarina Gojković.
Vojnović was, alongside his brother Konstantin Vojnović, educated in Dubrovnik, where they both converted to Roman Catholicism in ca. 1850. Upon the completion of studying law in Padova, Vojnović relocated to Herceg Novi where he served as mayor.

Đorđe Vojnović was initially a member of the People's Party. He became the Speaker of the Diet of Dalmatia in 1877. He also became one of the founders of the Serbian People's Party in 1879.

Vojnović eventually returned to Serbian Orthodoxy.

Vojnović was an eligible candidate for the Bulgarian throne.

He married an Italian woman of the Martinelli clan hailing from Trogir. The couple had three children: Dušan, Ljubica and Darinka.

References

1833 births
1895 deaths
People from Herceg Novi
People from the Kingdom of Dalmatia
Dorde
Converts to Roman Catholicism
Serbian Roman Catholics
Serbian politicians
People's Party (Dalmatia) politicians
Serb People's Party (Dalmatia) politicians
Members of the Austrian House of Deputies (1871–1873)
Members of the Austrian House of Deputies (1873–1879)
Members of the Austrian House of Deputies (1879–1885)
Members of the Austrian House of Deputies (1885–1891)
Mayors of places in Montenegro